Wilfried Armand Galimo (born 2 May 1991) is a Surinamese footballer who plays as a attacker for Camon.

Career

Galimo started his career with US de Matoury.

In 2018, Galimo signed fr Etoile de Matoury.

In 2012, Galimo played in the Suriname national football team. In 2020, Galimo signed for French side Camon.

In 2020, he signed for Camon.

References

External links

 

Expatriate footballers in France
Living people
Surinamese expatriate footballers
Association football forwards
1991 births
Suriname international footballers
Surinamese footballers